Bulayïq is a locality and archaeological site in central Xinjiang province in western China. It is located 10km north of Turpan city in the foothills of the Tien-shan Mountains. It is also known as 
Bīlayuq.

The site in the Tapin basin is arid. The remains there include a Tell with mud brick ruins protruding from the desert sands. The ruins were excavated by a German team in 1905, led by Albert von Le Coq. 

Among the ruins was found a monastic library, where a trove of ancient manuscripts in various Iranian languages were found. The texts show the influence of Orthodox and Nestorian Churches. Almost all known Christian religious texts in the ancient Sogdian language are from the Bīlayuq library.
The texts show the development and spread of Christianity in Central Asia.

See also 
 Murals from the Christian temple at Qocho

References 

Archaeological sites in China
Turkestan
Sogdian people